Jane's Island is a children's novel by Marjorie Hill Allee. The novel, illustrated by Maitland de Gorgoza, was first published in 1931 and was a Newbery Honor recipient in 1932.  The book "describes the unspoiled beauty of Woods Hole, Massachusetts, where scientists study marine biology with inadequate equipment but disciplined dedication."'

Plot summary
Ellen, a 17-year-old college freshman spends the summer in Wood's Hole with 12-year-old Jane, the daughter of a marine biologist. They go on picnics and fishing expeditions while learning about nature.

References

External links
 

1931 American novels
1931 children's books
American children's novels
Newbery Honor-winning works
Novels set in Massachusetts